Yu Rang (traditional 豫讓; simplified 豫让, ?-453 BC) was a famous Chinese assassin in the Spring and Autumn period.

Life according to the legend 
Yu Rang was an assassin in the early days of the Warring States period. He lived in the State of Jin (晉) around 450 BC. He was a grandson of Bi Yang.

Background 
Yu was the family-minister of Fan Jishe and Zhonghang Yin who were two of six influential ministers of the Jin State. But Jishe and Zhonghang Yin did not appreciate his services properly, so he left those families and served Zhi Yao (智伯瑶) (also known as Zhi Bo). Zhi Yao appreciated Yu Rang very much. In a cruel conflict, the Fan Family and Zhonghang Family were defeated by the four families Zhi, Zhao, Wei, Han. But Zhi Yao was too greedy, and the other three families allied to eliminate the Zhi clan in the aftermath of Battle of Jinyang and killed Zhi Yao in 453 BC. Because Viscount Zhao Xiangzi, brother of the Marquess Xian of Zhao, had hated Zhi Yao deeply, he actually used the skull of Zhi Yao as a drinking cup.

Lavatory assassination plot 

Yu Rang fled to the mountains and swore revenge for the Zhi Family, changed his name and became a servant in the palace of Jin's monarch. He was hiding in a lavatory to murder Zhao Xiangzi. But Zhao Xiangzi got worried and had his warriors search the lavatory. The warriors brought out Yu Rang and found he had a dagger. Zhao Xiangzi pointed him by a sword and asked what he had planned to do. Yu Rang answered that he wanted to avenge his former lord, Zhi Bo. The warriors were ready to kill him, but Zhao Xiangzi showed respect for Yu Rang's moral righteousness and ordered Yu Rang to be released.

Disguising as a beggar 
Yu Rang knew Zhao Xiangzi could recognize him again, so he disfigured himself having his skin covered with lacquer to create scars and sores. He became a beggar in a market, and even his wife only identified him by his voice. To change his voice, Yu Rang swallowed charcoal. A friend of him was worried and tried to persuade him to choose other methods, "You have many abilities and you can serve Zhao Family. They will trust you. Then, you can easily do what you plan to do." Yu Rang answered, "Because I am the family-minister of Zhi Bo, I want to revenge him. It shows faithfulness. But if I serve Zhao Xiangzi and kill him then, I am not a faithful person any longer."

Assassination plot at a bridge 
Armed with a sword, one day, Yu Rang lurked under a bridge. When Zhao Xiangzi made his way over the bridge, his horses were suddenly startled by Yu Rang approaching. Zhao Xiangzi recognized him despite the beggar appearance, and his warriors arrested Yu Rang. Xiangzi interrogated him, and Yu Rang explained that it still was his duty to avenge his former master Zhi Bo, even though he personally had nothing to gain from it. Zhao Xiangzi sighed with tears about Yu Rang still being loyal to Zhi Bo, but felt it was enough that he had already released him one time. So he decided to not release Yu Rang once more, and ordered his warriors to surround him.

Yu Rang replied, "You once released me, and all people praise your virtue. Today I am ready to die. But I ask for cutting your robe and thus show my mind of revenge."  Zhao Xiangzi deemed Yu Rang to be a faithful man, and gave his robe to Yu Rang. Yu Rang stabbed the robe three times, crying to heaven that now he was ready to report in front of Zhi Bo. He killed himself by his own sword. After his death, Yu Rang's story spread throughout China and Japan, and people were touched by his loyalty.

References

Literature 
 Sima Qian: War-Lords, Southside, Edinburgh 1974. p. 24, p. 136 et seq. (Google Books)
 Mark Edward Lewis: Sanctioned Violence in Early China, p. 77 et seq. in: Contemporary Studies in Philosophy and Literature. SUNY series in Chinese philosophy and culture. SUNY Press, New York 1990.  (Google Books)
 Chen Huaxin: Grand review of Chinese ancient dynasties, Shenzhen: Haitian Press 1993 (陳華新(1993), <<中國歷代宦官大觀>>, 深圳:海天出版社)

External links 
 The story of Yu Rang is recorded in the section Biographies of the Assassins of the Records of the Grand Historian (Shiji), the book by Sima Qian, created during the Han Dynasty. 
 private website
 private website

453 BC
Zhao (state)
Year of birth unknown
5th-century BC Chinese people
Chinese assassins
Year of death unknown
Suicides in China
Ancient people who committed suicide